The 2012 Junior Club World Cup was the 2nd Junior Club World Cup, an annual international ice hockey tournament. It took place between 18–26 August 2012 in Omsk, Russia.

The 2012 edition of the tournament will be sanctioned by the IIHF. Omsk, the host of the 2011 Junior Club World Cup, was also host the 2012 edition. The tournament featured the Sudbury Wolves of the Ontario Hockey League among other participants. Originally the tournament was to be composed of 12 teams. Teams from Slovakia and Switzerland however eventually did not participate in the tournament.

Teams

Group A

Group B

Group stage

Play-off round

Statistics

References

External links
 Official website

2012 in ice hockey
Junior Club World Cup
2012 in Russian sport
International ice hockey competitions hosted by Russia
Sport in Omsk